The 1956 Sacramento State Hornets football team represented Sacramento State College—now known as California State University, Sacramento—as a member of the Far Western Conference (FWC) during the 1956 NCAA College Division football season. Led by Dave Strong in his third and final season as head coach, Sacramento State compiled an overall record of 3–5–1 with a mark of 1–4 in conference play, placing fifth in the FWC. For the season the team was outscored by its opponents 178 to 128. The Hornets played home games at Grant Stadium in Sacramento, California.

Schedule

Notes

References

Sacramento State
Sacramento State Hornets football seasons
Sacramento State Hornets football